Leucine rich transmembrane and O-methyltransferase domain containing is a protein that in humans is encoded by the LRTOMT gene.

Clinical significance 
Mutations in LRTOMT are associated to non syndromic deafness.

Function 

This gene includes two transcript forms. The short form has one open reading frame (ORF), which encodes the leucine-rich repeats (LRR)-containing protein of unknown function. This protein is called LRTOMT1 or LRRC51. The long form has two alternative ORFs; the upstream ORF has the same translation start codon as used in the short form and the resulting transcript is a candidate for nonsense-mediated decay, and the downstream ORF encodes a different protein, which is a transmembrane catechol-O-methyltransferase and is called LRTOMT2, TOMT or COMT2. The COMT2 is essential for auditory and vestibular function. Defects in the COMT2 can cause nonsyndromic deafness. Alternatively spliced transcript variants from each transcript form have been found for this gene.

References

Further reading